The Old Skinflint (Spanish: El Viejo Hucha) is a 1942 Argentine film.

Cast

External links
 

1942 films
1940s Spanish-language films
Argentine black-and-white films
Argentine drama films
1942 drama films
Films directed by Lucas Demare
1940s Argentine films